The discography of Ozzy Osbourne, an English heavy metal vocalist, consists of 13 studio albums, five live albums, seven compilation albums, five extended plays (EPs), 65 singles, nine video albums and 41 music videos. After being fired from Black Sabbath in 1979, Osbourne started his solo career with a band consisting of guitarist Randy Rhoads, bassist Bob Daisley and drummer Lee Kerslake. The group released their debut album Blizzard of Ozz in 1980, which reached number 7 on the UK Albums Chart, number 8 on the Canadian Albums Chart, and number 21 on the US Billboard 200. Singles "Crazy Train" and "Mr Crowley" reached the top 50 of the UK Singles Chart, and the album has been certified four times platinum by the Recording Industry Association of America (RIAA). 1981's Diary of a Madman reached the top 20 in the UK, Canada and the US, and was certified triple platinum by the RIAA. The album was the last to feature Daisley and Kerslake, both of whom were fired before its release and replaced by Rudy Sarzo and Tommy Aldridge, respectively, as well as the last to feature Rhoads, who died in a plane crash on 19 March 1982.

Osbourne's first live album Speak of the Devil, featuring touring guitarist Brad Gillis, reached number 21 in the UK and number 14 in the US. Jake E. Lee joined in 1983, with Bark at the Moon released later in the year. The album reached number 24 in the UK and number 19 in the US, spawning UK top 40 singles "Bark at the Moon" and "So Tired". The Ultimate Sin followed in 1986, reaching the top ten in the UK and the US. Lead single "Shot in the Dark" reached number 20 on the UK Singles Chart and number 68 on the Billboard Hot 100. The 1987 live album Tribute charted in the top 20 in the UK and the top ten in the US. After Lee was replaced by Zakk Wylde, No Rest for the Wicked was released in 1988 and reached number 23 in the UK and number 13 in the US. The following year, Osbourne reached the top ten of the Hot 100 with Lita Ford on "Close My Eyes Forever", peaking at number 8. 1991's No More Tears reached the UK top 20, the US top ten, and was certified four times platinum by the RIAA. Singles "No More Tears" and "Mama, I'm Coming Home" both reached the UK top 50 and charted on the Billboard Hot 100. In 1992, Osbourne reached the UK Singles Chart top ten for the first time with Was (Not Was) and Kim Basinger on "Shake Your Head", which peaked at number 4.

After briefly retiring, Osbourne returned with Ozzmosis in 1995, which was his first album to reach the top five of the Billboard 200 when it peaked at number 4. Lead single "Perry Mason" reached number 23 on the UK Singles Chart. 1997 compilation The Ozzman Cometh reached the US top 20 and was certified double platinum. In 2001 he released Down to Earth, which reached number 19 in the UK and number 4 in the US. The album spawned the successful single "Dreamer", which was certified gold in Austria and Germany. In 2003, Osbourne collaborated with daughter Kelly on a recording of Black Sabbath's "Changes", which was both artists' first (and to date, only) number-one single in the UK. The Essential Ozzy Osbourne was released the same year, reaching number 21 in the UK. In 2005, Osbourne released an album of cover versions entitled Under Cover, which charted in the UK at number 67. 2007's Black Rain reached number 8 in the UK and number 3 in the US, while 2010's Scream reached number 12 in the UK and number 4 in the US. The compilation Memoirs Of A Madman charted in the UK at number 23 in 2014.

As of 2014, Osbourne has sold more than 100 million albums worldwide, including those during his time in Black Sabbath.

Albums

Studio albums

Live albums

Compilations

Extended plays

Singles

As lead artist

As featured artist

Videos

Video albums

Music videos

Other appearances

See also
Black Sabbath discography

Footnotes

References

External links
Ozzy Osbourne official website

Discography
Heavy metal discographies
Discographies of British artists no